TESS Hunt for Young and Maturing Exoplanets (THYME) is an exoplanet search project. The researchers of the THYME collaboration are mainly from the United States and search for young exoplanets using data from the Transiting Exoplanet Survey Satellite (TESS). The new discoveries should help to understand the early evolution of exoplanets. As of September 2022 the collaboration produced 7 papers announcing the discovery of exoplanets.

List of discoveries

References 

Exoplanet search projects